Lovers of Six Years is a 2008 South Korean film starring Kim Ha-neul and Yoon Kye-sang as a couple in their late twenties who've been dating for six years, whose relationship faces difficult new tests.

Plot
Jae-young and Da-jin have been going out for 6 years. Living in apartments next door to each other, Da-jin is an editor at a publishing company while Jae-young works as a producer for a home shopping network. Their sex life is not as hot as before, but they're comfortable in their relationship and know everything about each other. Da-jin doesn't mind asking Jae-young to buy tampons for her, and Jae-young visits Da-jin's mother from time to time to repair the house or just to say hello.

One day, Jae-young meets a younger, attractive temp who frankly expresses her interest in him, while at work Da-jin hires a charming new illustrator with whom she shares a lot in common. When these new people enter their lives, cracks in Da-jin and Jae-young's long-term relationship begin to show.

Cast
Kim Ha-neul as Lee Da-jin
Yoon Kye-sang as Kim Jae-young
Shin Sung-rok as Lee Jin-seong
Cha Hyun-jung as Lee Ji-eun
Ok Ji-young as Lee Mi-young
Seo Dong-won as Kim Min-jae
Kim Hye-ok as Da-jin's mother
Jung Yoon-min as Kwon Sung-cheol
Jo Hyang-gi as PD Choi
Kim Nan-hwi as Team leader Yoon
Kim Jae-rok as Department chief Kim
Lee Sang-yeob as Yoon-seok
Jung Dong-gyu as CEO 
Jin Yong-wook as man in rear-end collision
Park Young as real estate agent
Jo Yong-joon as record store clerk
Lee Dae-yeon as Da-jin's doctor
Kil Yong-woo as hair band man

References

External links
 https://web.archive.org/web/20100908083335/http://www.6love.co.kr/ 

2008 films
2000s Korean-language films
2008 romantic drama films
South Korean romantic drama films
2000s South Korean films